The Carlos Franco Invitational is a professional golf tournament held at the Carlos Franco Country & Golf Club, in Arroyos y Esteros, Paraguay. First held in 2004, the tournament was included in the TPG Tour schedule in 2007, which is the official professional golf tour in Argentina. The following year, it was also included on the Tour de las Americas calendar, the highest level tour in Latin America.

Winners

PO – won following playoff

External links
Tour de las Americas – official site
TPG Tour – official site

Golf tournaments in Paraguay
Tour de las Américas events